The Betty Carter Album is a 1976 album by Betty Carter. It is unique among her albums in its use of overdubbing on some tracks to allow her to record multiple vocal lines. It was also her first album for which she wrote the majority of the songs herself.

The album was originally released on Carter's own Bet-Car label. It was first reissued on CD by Verve in 1988.

Reception 
The singer Bilal names it among his 25 favorite albums and one of the first jazz records he purchased, citing Carter's vocal stylings.

Track listing 
 "You're a Sweetheart" (Harold Adamson, Jimmy McHugh) – 3:57
 "I Can't Help It" (Betty Carter) – 2:45
 "What is It?" (Carter) – 5:35
 "On Our Way Up (Sister Candy)" (Freddie Roach) – 1:36
 "We Tried" (Carter) – 5:53
 "Happy" (Carter) – 2:08
 "Sunday, Monday or Always" (Sonny Burke, Jimmy Van Heusen) – 4:19
 "Tight" (Carter) – 1:36
 "Children Learn What They Live" (Dorothy Law Nolt) – 4:16
 "Sounds (Movin' On)" (Carter) – 7:17

Personnel 
 Betty Carter - vocals
 Danny Mixon - piano
 Onaje Allan Gumbs - piano (tracks 1, 3 and 7)
 Buster Williams - double bass
 Louis Hayes - drums
 Chip Lyle - drums (tracks 2, 8, 9 and 10)

References

External links
 

1976 albums
Albums produced by Betty Carter
Betty Carter albums
Verve Records albums